The Capture of Rome on 20 September 1870 was the final event of the unification of Italy (Risorgimento), marking both the final defeat of the Papal States under Pope Pius IX and the unification of the Italian Peninsula (except San Marino) under the Kingdom of Italy.

The capture of Rome by the Italian Army brought an end to the Papal States, which had existed since 756, and the temporal power of the Holy See, and led to the establishment of Rome as the capital of unified Italy. It is today widely commemorated throughout Italy, with the Via XX Settembre street name in a considerable number of localities.

Background

During the Second Italian War of Independence, much of the Papal States had been conquered by the Kingdom of Sardinia under Victor Emmanuel II, who was proclaimed king of the new Kingdom of Italy on 17 March 1861. The new state still had not incorporated Latium, the region around Rome, which remained part of Papal States, and Veneto, which was ruled by Austria as a crown land and would only be annexed in 1866, after the Third War of Independence.

The first prime minister of Italy, Camillo Benso, Count of Cavour, died soon after the proclamation of Italian national unity, leaving to his successors the solution of the knotty Venetian and Roman problems. Cavour had firmly believed that without Rome as the capital, Italy's unification would be incomplete. "To go to Rome", said his successor, Bettino Ricasoli, "is not merely a right; it is an inexorable necessity." In regard to the future relations between church and state, Cavour's famous dictum was, "A free Church in a free State"; by which he meant that the former should be entirely free to exercise her spiritual powers and leave politics entirely to the latter.
 
On 27 March 1861, the new Italian Parliament met in Turin and declared Rome the capital of Italy. However, the Italian government could not take its seat in Rome because it did not control the territory. Also, a French garrison was maintained in the city by Emperor Napoleon III in support of Pope Pius IX, who was determined not to hand over temporal power in the State of the Church.

Franco-Prussian War
In July 1870, the Franco-Prussian War began, and by early August, Napoleon III recalled his garrison from Rome. The French not only needed the troops to defend their homeland, but were concerned that Italy might use the French presence in Rome as a pretext to join the war against France. In the Austro-Prussian War of 1866, Italy had allied with Prussia, and Italian public opinion favored the Prussian side at the start of the Franco-Prussian War. The removal of the French garrison allowed Italy to remain neutral and eased tensions between France and Italy.

It was only after the surrender of Napoleon and his army at the Battle of Sedan that the situation changed radically. The French Emperor was deposed and forced into exile. The best French units had been captured by the Prussians, who quickly followed up their success at Sedan by marching on Paris. Faced with a pressing need to defend its capital with its remaining forces, the provisional government of the new French Republic was clearly not in a military position to retaliate against Italy. In any case, the republican government was far less sympathetic to the Holy See than the Empire and did not possess the political will to protect the pope's position.

In July 1870, at the last moment of the papacy's rule over Rome, the First Vatican Council affirmed the doctrine of papal infallibility.

Prelude

In early September 1870, King Victor Emmanuel II sent Count Gustavo Ponza di San Martino to Pope Pius IX offering a face-saving proposal that agreed to the peaceful entry of the Italian army into Rome, under the guise of protecting the pope. Along with this letter, Ponza carried a list of provisions by Italian Prime Minister Giovanni Lanza, setting out ten articles as the basis of an agreement between Italy and the Holy See.

The Pope would retain his sovereign inviolability and prerogatives. The Leonine City would remain "under the full jurisdiction and sovereignty of the Pontiff". The Italian state would guarantee the pope's freedom to communicate with the Catholic world, as well as diplomatic immunity both for papal nuncios and envoys in foreign lands and for foreign diplomats at the Holy See. The government would supply a permanent annual fund for the pope and the cardinals, equal to the amount currently assigned to them by the budget of the pontifical state, and would assume all papal civil servants and soldiers onto the state payroll, with full pensions as long as they were Italian.

According to Raffaele De Cesare:

Ponza then informed Lanza of the pope's refusal of the ultimatum. The next day, 11 September, Italian troops led by General Raffaele Cadorna crossed into the Papal States with the objective of taking Rome, occupying the port city of Civitavecchia on 16 September. The papal garrisons had retreated from Orvieto, Viterbo, Alatri, Frosinone and other strongholds in Latium. Under instructions from the Italian government, which still hoped to avoid seizing the capital by force, Cadorna sent a final appeal to the papal government later the same day for the peaceful surrender of Rome. In a letter addressed to General Hermann Kanzler, commander of the papal troops in Rome, he highlighted "the strength of the forces involved in the attack compared to those on the defense", and renewed the request that the papal army offered no resistance. Kanzler refused, responding to Cadorna that he and the Italian government would be responsible, "before God and before the tribunal of history", for any casualties that would result from an attack.

The capture of Rome

On 18 September, Minister of War Cesare Ricotti-Magnani gave Cadorna the order to attack Rome but informed that the Leonine City, which would be reserved for the pope, should be spared, while also advising moderation. The plan of attack was left entirely up to him. When the Italian army approached the Aurelian Walls that defended the city, the papal force, commanded by General Kanzler, was composed of the Swiss Guards and the Papal Zouaves—volunteers from France, Austria, the Netherlands, Spain, and other countries—for a total of 13,157 defenders against some 50,000 Italians. The American consul in Rome, Maitland Armstrong, described the civilian population as unwilling to defend the pope's rule, and only two hundred people in the whole city answered the papacy's call for volunteers.

The Italian army reached the Aurelian Walls on September 19 and placed Rome under siege. Pius IX decided that the surrender of the city would be granted only after his troops had put up enough resistance in order to make it plain that the Italian takeover was achieved through force and not freely accepted. At 5 a.m. on September 20, the Italian troops began firing cannons at the city walls. Cadorna commanded the major line of assault, while troops on the other side of the city, charged with creating a distraction, were led by General Nino Bixio. After a few hours the Italian army had breached the Aurelian Walls near Porta Pia, through where the troops flooded onto Rome. 49 Italian soldiers and 19 Papal soldiers died in the fighting. According to slightly different figures in a 2009 history of the Vatican military, the defence of Rome was far from bloodless, leaving 12 dead and 47 wounded amongst the Papal forces and 32 dead plus 145 wounded of the regular Italian troops. 

By 6 a.m., one hour after the attack began, foreign envoys began to arrive at the Vatican to meet the pope, including the ambassadors of France, Austria-Hungary and Prussia. Pius, members of his entourage, and the diplomatic corps later gathered at his library, where, around 9 a.m., he received the news from Kanzler's chief of staff of the opening of the breach near Porta Pia. Shortly afterwards, the terms of the Act of Capitulation were presented by Cadorna and signed by Kanzler at Villa Albani, by which all of Rome, excluding the Leonine City, came under control of the Royal Italian Army. A white flag was hoisted from the dome of St. Peter's Basilica, and the defeated papal forces were escorted to St. Peter's Square by Italian troops.

Aftermath
 
As part of the terms of surrender, the Papal Army was disbanded and its foreign soldiers were immediately repatriated. The pope was allowed to retain the Swiss, Noble, and Palatine guard units. With most of the papal military demobilized, protests against Pius took place in the Leonine City the day after the attack.

Out of 167,548 eligible voters, an overwhelming majority of 133,681 voted in favor of union with Italy, with 1,507 votes against. On 9 October, a royal decree confirmed the incorporation of Rome and the surrounding region of Lazio into the Kingdom of Italy. Pius protested the plebiscite, denouncing instances of electoral violence employed to secure it. The pope issued the encyclical Respicientes on 1 November, in which he proclaimed a mass excommunication of the invaders.

The Italian government promised Pius sovereignty over the Leonine City and gave him assurances of his inviolability, but the pope still would not agree to give up his claims to a broader territory, and claimed that since his army had been disbanded, apart from a few guards, he was unable to ensure public order even in such a small area. On 13 May 1871, the Italian Parliament passed the Law of Guarantees, which granted the pope extensive prerogatives, such as independence on foreign affairs and an annual grant from the Italian government. While these measures satisfied the international community, including the Catholic countries, Pius refused to accept the law, proclaiming himself a "prisoner in the Vatican".

Legacy

For nearly sixty years thereafter, relations between the Papacy and the Italian government were hostile, and the status of the Pope became known as the "Roman Question".

Negotiations for the settlement of the Roman Question began in 1926 between the government of Fascist Italy and the Holy See, and culminated in the Lateran Pacts, signed—the Treaty says—for King Victor Emmanuel III of Italy by Benito Mussolini, Prime Minister and Head of Government, and for Pope Pius XI by Pietro Gasparri, Cardinal Secretary of State, on February 11, 1929. The agreements were signed in the Lateran Palace, from which they take their name. In the subsequent Lateran Treaty of 1929, the Holy See renounced its claims over most of the city of Rome in return for Italy's recognition of the Vatican City.

The Via Pia, the road departing from Porta Pia, was rechristened Via XX Settembre (September 20). Subsequently, in numerous Italian cities the name Venti Settembre was given to the main road leading to the local cathedral.

On 20 September 2000, an item in the Catholic publication Avvenire stated:

See also
History of Rome
Roman Republic (1849)
La presa di Roma, 1905 silent film directed by Filoteo Alberini.

Citations

References
 
 De Cesare, Raffaele. (1909).The Last Days of Papal Rome. London: Archibald Constable & Co.
 
 
 
 
 Schapiro, J. Salwyn, Ph.D., Modern and Contemporary European History (1815–1921) (Houghton Mifflin Company, The Riverside Press Cambridge, 1921, Revised Edition)

External links

Article by Angela Pellicciari 
Historical summary at cronologia.leonardo.it 
The Papal Zouaves
Papal States and all that : Part 1. Vatican Radio. 
Papal States and all that : Part 2. Vatican Radio.

Rome
Italian unification
Rome
Rome
Rome 1870
1870 in Italy
Holy See–Italy relations
Pope Pius IX
1870s in Rome
1870 in the Papal States
Military history of Rome
September 1870 events